Gheorghe Brandabura (23 February 1913 – date of death unknown) was a Romanian football midfielder who played for Romania in the 1938 FIFA World Cup. He also played for FC Juventus București.

References

External links

1913 births
Romanian footballers
Romania international footballers
Association football midfielders
1938 FIFA World Cup players
FC Petrolul Ploiești players
Venus București players
Liga I players
Liga II players
Year of death missing
People from Argeș County